Oecothea is a genus of flies in the family Heleomyzidae. There are at least 20 described species in Oecothea.

Species
These 20 species belong to the genus Oecothea:

O. acuta Gorodkov, 1959 c g
O. aristata (Malloch, 1919)
O. desertorum Gorodkov, 1959 c g
O. dubia Gorodkov, 1959 c g
O. dubinini Gorodkov, 1959 c g
O. ellobii Gorodkov, 1978 c g
O. fenestralis (Fallén, 1820)
O. hamulifera Gorodkov, 1959 c g
O. hungarica Papp, 1980 c g
O. kapitonovi Gorodkov, 1964 c g
O. longipes Gorodkov, 1959 c g
O. macrocerca Gorodkov, 1959 c g
O. mongolica Gorodkov, 1969 c g
O. pakistanica (Okadome, 1991) c g
O. pamirica Gorodkov, 1959 c g
O. praecox Loew, 1862 c g
O. similis Gorodkov, 1969 c g
O. specus (Aldrich, 1897)i c g b
O. syriaca Villeneuve, 1924 c g
O. ushinskii Gorodkov, 1959 c g

Data sources: i = ITIS, c = Catalogue of Life, g = GBIF, b = Bugguide.net

References

Further reading

 

Heleomyzidae
Articles created by Qbugbot